Upper Chehalis (Q̉ʷay̓áyiłq̉) is a member of the Tsamosan (Olympic) branch of the Coast Salish family of Salishan languages. Thompson's 1979 classification lists Upper Chehalis as more closely related to the Cowlitz language than it is to Lower Chehalis.

Phonology

References

External links
Upper Chehalis (Intercontinental Dictionary Series)

Coast Salish languages
Languages extinct in the 2000s